So Does an Automobile is a 1939 Fleischer Studios animated short film directed by Dave Fleischer and starring Margie Hines as Betty Boop.

Synopsis
Betty operates an auto repair garage for sick and injured automobiles. Betty sings as she restores broken-down taxicabs, high-price limousines and restores a police car with sore and flat feet (tires) back to perfect condition again.

Notes
Instrumental versions of the theme song for this cartoon were later used in Betty's next film, Musical Mountaineers, and later in the 1940 Popeye cartoon, Wimmin Hadn't Oughta Drive.

References

External links
So Does an Automobile on Youtube.
So Does an Automobile at IMDb.
So Does an Automobile at the Big Cartoon Database.

1939 films
Betty Boop cartoons
1930s American animated films
American black-and-white films
1939 animated films
Paramount Pictures short films
Short films directed by Dave Fleischer
Fleischer Studios short films